Cleydael, also known as Quarter Neck, is a historic home located near Weedonville, King George County, Virginia. It was built in 1859, and is a two-story, five bay, frame dwelling. It has a standing seam, metal gable roof and wraparound porch.  The house served as the summer residence for King George County's wealthiest resident, Dr. Richard H. Stuart.

On April 23, 1865 John Wilkes Booth was refused accommodations and medical treatment by Dr. Stuart.

It was listed on the National Register of Historic Places in 1986.

References

Houses on the National Register of Historic Places in Virginia
Houses completed in 1859
Houses in King George County, Virginia
National Register of Historic Places in King George County, Virginia